Francisco 'Paco' Parreño Granados (born 16 June 1949) is a Spanish retired footballer who played as a goalkeeper, and a current manager.

Playing career
Born in Córdoba, Andalusia, Parreño graduated with Real Betis' youth setup, and made his senior debuts with Hércules CF in 1968, in Tercera División. He achieved promotion to Segunda División with the latter in 1970, and made his professional debut on 3 January 1971, starting in a 2–2 home draw against Córdoba CF.

In the 1971 summer Parreño moved to La Liga's RCD Espanyol, but after being only fourth-choice, he signed for Rayo Vallecano in the following year. After a two-season spell at CD Alcoyano and CD Eldense in the third division, he returned to the second level in 1975, joining Recreativo de Huelva.

Parreño never appeared in any league games for Recre and resumed his career in the lower leagues, representing Alcoyano (two stints) and CF Gandía. He retired in 1981, aged 32.

Managerial career
Immediately after retiring Parreño started working as a manager, coaching his former club Alcoyano. He subsequently managed UD Rayo Ibense, Alcoyano, Benidorm CF, Ontinyent CF, Eldense and Gimnàstic de Tarragona in the 80s, all of them (except Rayo) in Segunda División B.

Parreño also remained in the third level in the 90s, managing Cartagena FC, Córdoba, Gandía, CD Mensajero and Real Avilés. In 2000, he was appointed Águilas CF manager, but failed to achieve a single win during his time at the club, and subsequently suffered team relegation.

Parreño subsequently managed Talavera CF (two spells) and AD Alcorcón, all in the third division. On 31 December 2014, after nearly ten years without a club, he was named Rayo Ibense manager, but left the club a month later.

References

External links
 
 

1949 births
Living people
Footballers from Córdoba, Spain
Spanish footballers
Footballers from Andalusia
Association football goalkeepers
Segunda División players
Tercera División players
Hércules CF players
RCD Espanyol footballers
Rayo Vallecano players
Recreativo de Huelva players
CD Alcoyano footballers
CD Eldense footballers
Spanish football managers
CD Alcoyano managers
CD Eldense managers
Gimnàstic de Tarragona managers
Córdoba CF managers
Real Avilés CF managers
Atlético Levante UD managers
AD Alcorcón managers
CF Gandía players
CF Gandía managers